Fit to Serve is the third studio album by American singer-songwriter A. J. Croce, released in 1998.

Track listing
all songs by A. J. Croce, except where noted

"Fit to Serve" – 3:39
"I Don't Mind" – 3:04
"Lover's Serenade" – 3:55
"Trouble in Mind" (Richard M. Jones) – 3:19
"Texas Ruby" (Croce, Gary Nicholson) – 3:34
"Uncommon Sense" – 3:31
"I'll Get Through" – 3:04
"Cry to Me" (Bert Russell) – 3:51
"So in Love" – 3:20
"Count the Ways" – 3:31
"Too Late" – 3:07
"Judgement Day" (Croce, Nicholson) – 2:27
"Nobody Else" – 2:20

Personnel
A. J. Croce – piano, vocals
David Curtis – bass
Paul Kimbarow – drums

Production
Producers: A. J. Croce, Jim Gaines, Mark Lampe

A. J. Croce albums
1998 albums